José Antonio Quezada Salazar (born 17 August 1990) is a Chilean footballer.

International career
In December 2011 Quezada was called-up by Claudio Borghi to the Chile national team nominee that played with Paraguay. However, he was chosen as back-up of first-choice Luis Marín and didn’t play in the 3–2 win at La Serena.

References

External links
 
 

1990 births
Living people
Chilean footballers
Magallanes footballers
Unión Española footballers
Club Deportivo Palestino footballers
Chilean Primera División players
Primera B de Chile players
Association football goalkeepers
Footballers from Santiago